Saira Afzal Tarar (born 7 June 1966) is a Pakistani politician who served as Minister for National Health Services Regulation and Coordination, in the Abbasi cabinet from August 2017 to May 2018. She served as the Minister of State for National Health Services Regulation and Coordination from 2013 to 2017. A leader of Pakistan Muslim League (Nawaz), she had been a member of the National Assembly of Pakistan from 2008 to May 2018.

Early life
She was born on 7 June 1966 in Hafizabad, Punjab, Pakistan.

Political career
Tarar was elected to the National Assembly of Pakistan as a candidate of Pakistan Muslim League (N) (PML-N) from Constituency NA-102 (Hafizabad-I) in 2008 Pakistani general election.

She was re-elected to the National Assembly as a candidate of PML-N from Constituency NA-102 (Hafizabad-I) in 2013 Pakistani general election.

In June 2013, she was appointed the Minister of State for Health in the cabinet of Prime Minister Nawaz Sharif. She had ceased to hold ministerial office in July 2017 when the federal cabinet was disbanded following the disqualification of the then Prime Minister Nawaz Sharif after Panama Papers case decision.

Following the election of Shahid Khaqan Abbasi as Prime Minister of Pakistan in August 2017, she was inducted into the federal cabinet of Abbasi. She was appointed federal Minister of National Health Services Regulation and Coordination. Upon the dissolution of the National Assembly on the expiration of its term on 31 May 2018, Tarar ceased to hold the office as Federal Minister for National Health Services Regulation and Coordination. In March 2018, she received Sitara-i-Imtiaz for her public service by the President of Pakistan, Mamnoon Hussain.

References

Government ministers of Pakistan
Living people
People from Hafizabad District
People from Lahore
Punjabi women
University of the Punjab alumni
Pakistan Muslim League (N) MNAs
Pakistani MNAs 2008–2013
Pakistani MNAs 2013–2018
1966 births
Women members of the National Assembly of Pakistan
Women government ministers of Pakistan
Recipients of Sitara-i-Imtiaz
21st-century Pakistani women politicians